Jeremy Ford (born 1985) is an American chef. While working for chef Jean-Georges Vongerichten's Matador Room, Ford participated in the thirteenth and California season of Top Chef in 2015, ultimately winning the season's title. He subsequently left Matador Room and opened his own restaurant, Stubborn Seed in South Beach, and later Krun-Chi in Miami. In 2021, he opened The Butcher's Club at the PGA National Resort & Spa, and started to co-host TruTV's Fast Foodies with fellow Top Chef winner Kristen Kish and Iron Chef America season 13 episode 8 winner Justin Sutherland.

Early life 
Ford developed his love for cooking at 14 years old when he met his maternal grandmother in his hometown of Jacksonville, Florida.

Career 
He began his cooking career at 16 years old as the garde manger of Matthews, a four-diamond Mediterranean-style restaurant in Jacksonville. A year later, he moved to Los Angeles to work at the world-renowned L'Orangerie under executive chef Christophe Eme, absorbing French-cooking skills, later moving to Patina to work with master chef Joachim Splichal. In 2008, he secured a position with the celebrated South Florida chef Dean Max at the latter's prominent restaurant, 3030 Ocean in Fort Lauderdale. Much later, he beat 30 other chefs in a two-day competition to get the executive chef position at Vongerichten's Matador Room.

Personal life 
Ford is the father of three daughters.

References

External links 
 Stubborn Seed
 The Butcher's Club at PGA National Resort

Living people
1985 births
People from Jacksonville, Florida
American male chefs
Top Chef contestants
Businesspeople from Miami
Businesspeople from Florida
Chefs from Florida